This was the first edition of the tournament.

Facundo Díaz Acosta won the title after defeating Pedro Boscardin Dias 7–5, 7–6(7–4) in the final.

Seeds

Draw

Finals

Top half

Bottom half

References

External links
Main draw
Qualifying draw

Challenger Coquimbo - 1
Challenger Coquimbo